The Old Fire Station is a historic fire station at 822 Swanwick Street in Chester, Illinois. The fire station was built in 1935 after the Chester City Council voted to fund a new fire station the previous year. Additional funding came from New Deal programs which promoted public works projects; the Old Fire Station was one of hundreds of new fire stations built nationwide under the New Deal. City engineer Theo F. Lacey designed the building, a vernacular structure built with stone blocks taken from the recently demolished Ballard Building. The fire department used the building until 1961; the second floor was also used as a community center.

The building was added to the National Register of Historic Places on June 15, 2018.

References

National Register of Historic Places in Randolph County, Illinois
Fire stations on the National Register of Historic Places in Illinois
Fire stations completed in 1935